PAMM may refer to:

 Percent allocation management module
 Pérez Art Museum Miami